Jarvis Giles (born January 15, 1990) is an American football running back. After graduating from Gaither High School in 2008, Giles committed to South Carolina for 2009. In Week 3 of 2009 against Florida Atlantic, Giles led the Gamecocks with 113 yards rushing and a touchdown, earning him Southeastern Conference Freshman of the Week, making him the second Gamecock to be honored by the SEC in 2009 (behind Devin Taylor). In 2010, after the emergence of Marcus Lattimore, Giles transferred to Louisville. Giles stated that he had considered transferring to a school closer to his hometown, and a year later, Giles considered transferring to USF. Giles is no longer part of the Louisville roster.

College statistics

References

External links
 South Carolina Gamecocks bio
 Louisville Cardinals bio

1990 births
Living people
Players of American football from South Carolina
Players of American football from Tampa, Florida
American football running backs
South Carolina Gamecocks football players
Louisville Cardinals football players